Alpinestars is a manufacturer of clothing and protective gear for motorsports and action sports founded in 1963, and located in Asolo, Italy. Its lines include specialized products for MotoGP, motocross, motorcycling, Formula One, WEC, V8 Supercars, NASCAR, mountain biking, and surfing, and motorsports-themed, non-sports clothing, with fashion design centers in Italy and California.

History

Founded in 1963 by Sante Mazzarolo in Asolo, Italy, the company started out making hiking and ski boots, but quickly shifted its focus to making boots for motocross racing, and road racing boots shortly thereafter. The company's name comes from the English translation of the Italian mountain flower Stella Alpina (Edelweiss), which grows high in the mountains around the area where the company was founded. They sponsored motorsport world champions such as Nicky Hayden, Roger DeCoster, Kenny Roberts, Mick Doohan and Marc Márquez. During the 1990s the company branched out into manufacturing all types of technical protective gear for motorcycling such as gloves, jackets, and full leather suits.

The company has been headed by Sante's son, Gabriele Mazzarolo, since 1993. There are offices in Los Angeles and Bangkok while the original headquarters and main research & development facility remain in Northern Italy.

Alpinestars leather suits and protective gear are worn MotoGP World Champions Marc Márquez, Casey Stoner and Jorge Lorenzo, and World Superbike Champions Ben Spies and Troy Corser.  Alpinestars' motocross gear is used by AMA and World Motocross champions Marvin Musquin, Tyla Rattray, David Philippaerts, Christophe Pourcel, and Ryan Villopoto.

In 2011 Alpinestars developed the Tech Air Race System, an electronic airbag safety system that uses a data logging unit and dual charge inflation module. It was used in the MotoGP and World Superbike championships. In June 2013 Marc Márquez crashed at a speed of around 337 km/h (209 mph) while wearing the airbag suit and did not sustain serious injuries.

Alpinestars developed flame and heat retardant Nomex fire suits, footwear, gloves, and underwear for Formula One and NASCAR, which has been worn by recent champions Michael Schumacher, Jenson Button, Fernando Alonso and Jimmie Johnson. Top Gears the Stig wears a white Alpinestars race suit, shoes and gloves.

Alpinestars made mountain bikes until 1996.

MotoGP
Teams

MotoGP
 Monster Energy Yamaha MotoGP
 Red Bull KTM Factory Racing
 Tech 3 KTM Factory Racing

Moto2
 Red Bull KTM Ajo Motorsport

Moto3
 Red Bull KTM Ajo Motorsport

Riders
MotoGP
 Marc Márquez
 Maverick Viñales
 Fabio Quartararo
 Álex Rins
 Francesco Bagnaia
 Álex Márquez
 Enea Bastianini
 Jorge Martín
 Jack Miller
 Fabio Di Giannantonio

Moto2
 Pedro Acosta
 Romano Fenati
 Eric Granado
 Stefano Manzi
 Bo Bendsneyder
 Niki Tuuli

Moto3
 María Herrera
 Arón Canet
 Hiroki Ono

Former sponsorships

Formula One
Teams
 Red Bull Racing
 Brawn GP
 British American Racing
 Honda
 Mercedes
 Toyota Racing
 Lotus F1 Team

RidersMotoGP'
 Casey Stoner
 Daijiro Kato
 Alex Hofmann
 Tohru Ukawa
 Carlos Checa
 Troy Bayliss 
 Kenny Roberts Jr.
 Kurtis Roberts
 John Hopkins
 Mika Kallio
 Toni Elías
 Ben Spies
 Broc Parkes
 Héctor Barberá
 Scott Redding
 Aleix Espargaró
 Dani Pedrosa
 Thomas Lüthi
 Jorge Lorenzo
 Andrea Dovizioso
 Cal Crutchlow
 Johann Zarco
 Takaaki Nakagami

Motorsport events
 GP2 Series
 GP3 Series
 MotoGP

Other motorsport
 Scott Dixon

References

External links

Sporting goods manufacturers of Italy
Clothing companies established in 1963
Italian companies established in 1963
Clothing companies of Italy
Motorcycle safety gear manufacturers
Companies based in Veneto
Motorcycling retailers
Automotive motorsports and performance companies
Shoe brands